Baloda Bazar is one of the 90 Legislative Assembly constituencies of Chhattisgarh state in India. It is in Baloda Bazar district.

Members of Legislative Assembly

Election results

2018

See also
List of constituencies of the Chhattisgarh Legislative Assembly
Baloda Bazar district

References

Baloda Bazar district
Assembly constituencies of Chhattisgarh